Ocean Breeze may refer to:

Places
 Ocean Breeze, Florida
 Ocean Breeze, neighborhood in South Beach, Staten Island, New York
 Ocean Breeze Water Park, a water park in Virginia Beach, Virginia

Ships
 , an ocean liner built in 1955, formerly named OceanBreeze.
 , a luxury yacht formerly owned by Saddam Hussein

See also
 Sea breeze
 Sea Breeze (disambiguation)
 Bay breeze (disambiguation)
 Ocean (disambiguation)
 Breeze (disambiguation)